Hari Khadka (born 26 November 1976) is a Nepalese former footballer who last played for Zejtun Corinthians F.C. He is also the leading goal scorers for Nepal alongside Nirajan Rayamajhi—both with 13 goals apiece.
After retirement from football Hari has been busy coaching different teams in Nepalese League. He also took part in the Fifa 'A' Level training program.

International goals 

Scores and results list Nepal's goal tally first, score column indicates score after each Nepal goal.

References

External links
 

1976 births
Sportspeople from Kathmandu
Nepalese footballers
Nepal international footballers
Ranipokhari Corner Team players
Nepalese expatriate footballers
Expatriate footballers in Mexico
Expatriate footballers in Malta
Expatriate footballers in India
Expatriate footballers in Bangladesh
Nepalese expatriate sportspeople in India
Atlante F.C. footballers
Living people
Muktijoddha Sangsad KC players
Association football forwards
Footballers at the 1998 Asian Games
Asian Games competitors for Nepal
People from Jhapa District
Tollygunge Agragami FC players
South Asian Games medalists in football
South Asian Games silver medalists for Nepal